Shyama Charan Lahiri (30 September 1828 – 26 September 1895), best known as Lahiri Mahasaya, was an Indian yogi guru who founded the Kriya Yoga school. In 1861, his non-physical master Mahavatar Babaji appeared to him, ordering him to revive the yogic science of Kriya Yoga to the public after centuries of its guarding by masters. He was unusual among Indian holy people in that he was a householder, marrying, raising a family, and working as a government accountant, an "Ideal yogi-householder." He became known in the West through Paramahansa Yogananda, a disciple of Sri Yukteswar Giri, and through Yogananda's 1946 book Autobiography of a Yogi, considering him a Yogavatar, or "Incarnation of Yoga," since Lahiri himself was chosen by the yogic masters to disseminate the principles of yoga to the world.

Biography

Early life
Lahiri was born into a Brahmin family in the Ghurni village (presently a neighborhood of Krishnanagar town) in Nadia district of Bengal Province. He was the youngest son of Muktakashi, wife of Gaur Mohan Lahiri. His mother died when he was a child — there is very little known about her, except that she was a devotee of Lord Shiva. At the age of three or four, he was often seen sitting in meditation, with his body buried in the sand up to his neck. When Lahiri was five, the family's ancestral home was lost in a flood, so the family moved to Varanasi, where he would spend most of his life.

As a child, he studied Urdu and Hindi, gradually moving on to Bengali, Sanskrit, Persian, French and English at the Government Sanskrit College, along with study of the Vedas. Reciting the Vedas, bathing in the Ganges, and worship were part of his daily routine.

In 1846, he was married to Srimati Kashi Moni. They had two sons, Tincouri and Ducouri, and three daughters, Harimoti, Harikamini and Harimohini. His two sons were considered saints. Lahiri's wife became his disciple and was affectionately called by Guru Ma. His work as an accountant in the Military Engineering Department of the Indian government took him all over India. After the death of his father, he took on the role of supporting the entire family in Varanasi.

Teacher of Kriya Yoga

In 1861, Lahiri was transferred to Ranikhet, in the foothills of the Himalayas. One day, while walking in the hills of Dunagiri, he heard a voice calling to him. After climbing further, he met his Guru Mahavatar Babaji, who initiated him into the techniques of Kriya Yoga. Babaji told Lahiri that the rest of his life was to be given to spreading the Kriya message.

Soon after, Lahiri Mahasaya returned to Varanasi, where he began initiating sincere seekers into the path of Kriya Yoga. Over time, more and more people flocked to receive the teachings of Kriya from Lahiri. To note his high spiritual state, his followers called him Mahasaya, which is a Sanskrit spiritual title translated as 'large-minded;' he was also popularly known as Yogiraj and Kashi Baba by his followers. He organized many study groups and gave regular discourses on the Bhagavad Gita at his "Gita Assemblies." He freely gave Kriya initiation to those of every faith, including Hindus, Muslims, and Christians, at a time when caste bigotry was very strong. He encouraged his students to adhere to the tenets of their own faith, adding the Kriya techniques to what they already were practicing.

He continued his dual role of accountant and supporter to his family, and a teacher of Kriya Yoga, until 1886, when he was able to retire on a pension. More and more visitors came to see him at this time. He rarely left his sitting room, available to all who sought his darshan. He often exhibited the breathless state of superconscious samādhi.

Over the years he gave initiation to gardeners, postmen, kings, maharajas, sannyasis, householders, people considered to be lower caste, Christians, and Muslims. At that time, it was unusual for a strict Brahmin to associate so closely with people from all castes.

Some of his notable disciples included Panchanan Bhattacharya, Swami Sri Yukteswar Giri, Swami Pranabananda, Swami Keshavananda Brahmachari, Bhupendranath Sanyal and the parents of Paramahansa Yogananda. Others who received initiation into Kriya Yoga from Lahiri included Bhaskarananda Saraswati of Benares, Balananda Brahmachari of Deogarh, Maharaja Iswari Narayan Sinha Bahadur of Benares and his son.

Biographer and Yogacharya Dr. Ashoke Kumar Chatterjee, in his book "Purana Purusha" depicts that Lahiri initiated Sai Baba of Shirdi into Kriya Yoga, based on a passage in Lahiri's 26 secret diary. He gave permission to one disciple, Panchanan Bhattacharya, to start an institution in Kolkata to spread the teachings of Kriya Yoga. The Arya Mission Institution published commentaries by Lahiri on the Bhagavad Gita, along with other spiritual books, including a Bengali translation of the Gita. Lahiri himself had printed thousands of small books with excerpted passages from the Gita, in Bengali and Hindi, and distributed them for free, an unusual idea at that time.

In 1895, he began gathering his disciples, letting some of them know that he would soon be leaving the body. Moments before his passing, he said simply, "I am going home. Be comforted; I shall rise again." He then turned his body around three times, faced north, and consciously left his body, entering mahasamadhi. Lahiri Mahasaya died on 26 September 1895, four days before turning 67. He was cremated according to Hindu Brahmin rites at Manikarnika Ghat in Varanasi.

Teachings

Kriya Yoga
The central spiritual practice which he taught to his disciples was Kriya Yoga, a series of inner pranayama practices that quickly hasten the spiritual growth of the practitioner. He taught this technique to all sincere seekers, regardless of their religious background. In response to many types of problems that disciples would bring him, his advice would be the same — to practice more Kriya Yoga.
Regarding Kriya Yoga, he said:
Always remember that you belong to no one, and no one belongs to you. Reflect that some day you will suddenly have to leave everything in this world–so make the acquaintanceship of God now. Prepare yourself for the coming astral journey of death by daily riding in the balloon of God-perception. Through delusion you are perceiving yourself as a bundle of flesh and bones, which at best is a nest of troubles. Meditate unceasingly, that you may quickly behold yourself as the Infinite Essence, free from every form of misery. Cease being a prisoner of the body; using the secret key of Kriya, learn to escape into Spirit.

He taught that Kriya practice would give the yogi direct experience of truth, unlike mere theoretical discussion of the scriptures, and to:
Solve all your problems through meditation. Exchange unprofitable religious speculations for actual God-contact. Clear your mind of dogmatic theological debris; let in the fresh, healing waters of direct perception. Attune yourself to the active inner Guidance; the Divine Voice has the answer to every dilemma of life. Though man’s ingenuity for getting himself into trouble appears to be endless, the Infinite Succor is no less resourceful.

Guru-disciple relationship
Lahiri often spoke of the Guru-disciple relationship in the context of Kriya Yoga. He always gave the Kriya technique as an initiation, and taught that the technique was only properly learned as part of the Guru-disciple relationship. Frequently he referred to the realization that comes through practicing Kriya as taught by the Guru, and the grace that comes through the 'transmission' of the Guru. He also taught that the grace of the Guru comes automatically if his instructions are followed. He suggested contacting the Guru during meditation, counseling that it wasn't always necessary to see his physical form.

Regarding the necessity of the help of a Guru to deep yoga practice, he said:
It is absolutely necessary for all devotees to totally surrender to their Guru. The more one can surrender to the Guru, the more he can ascertain the subtlest of the subtle techniques of yoga from his Guru. Without surrender, nothing can be derived from the Guru.

The relationship Lahiri Mahasaya had with his own disciples was very individual. He even varied the way he taught the Kriya Yoga practice to each disciple, depending on their individual spiritual needs.

Other teachings
Lahiri taught that if one is earning an honest living and practicing honesty, then there was no need to alter one's external life in any significant way in order to become aware of God's presence. If a student neglected his worldly duties, he would correct him. It was extremely rare for him to advise sannyas, or complete worldly renunciation by becoming a swami. Instead, he advised marriage for most of his disciples along with Kriya Yoga practice.

He generally eschewed organized religion, but he allowed at least one advanced disciple, Panchanan Bhattacharya, to open the "Arya Mission Institution" in Kolkata to spread Kriya teachings. Other disciples of Lahiri also started organizations to spread the Kriya Yoga message, including Yukteswar Giri with his Satsanga Sabha. Generally, he preferred Kriya to spread naturally.

Lahiri frequently taught the Bhagavad Gita. His regular Gita assemblies, called Gita Sabha, attracted many disciples. He asked several of his close disciples to write interpretations of the Gita by tuning in to his own realization. Lahiri taught that the Battle of Kurukshetra was really an inner psychological battle, and that the different characters in the battle were actually psychological traits within the struggling yogi. This understanding would later become the foundation of Paramahansa Yogananda's commentaries on the Bhagavad Gita "God Talks with Arjuna: The Bhagavad Gita". He also taught that the epic story of the Mahabharata showed the soul's descent into matter, and its challenges in retracing its way back to spirit.

The lineage of Kriya Yoga organizations
The lineage of Self-Realization Fellowship (SRF)/Yogoda Satsanga Society of India (YSS), founded by Paramahansa Yogananda includes Jesus Christ, Bhagavan Krishna, Mahavatar Babaji, Lahiri Mahasaya, Sri Yukteswar Giri and Paramahansa Yogananda. According to SRF, Yogananda stated, before his passing, that it was "God's wish that he be the last in the SRF line of Gurus." When questioned about the succession of SRF/YSS leadership, Yogananda answered, “There will always be at the head of this organization men and women of realization. They are already known to God and the Gurus. They shall serve as my spiritual successor and representative in all spiritual and organizational matters.”

According to the Kriya Yoga Institute, their lineage includes Mahavatar Babaji, Lahiri Mahasaya, Sri Yukteswar Giri, Shrimat Bhupendranath Sanyal Mahashaya, Paramahansa Yogananda, Satyananda Giri, Hariharananda Giri.

See also 
Khecarī mudrā
 Pranahuti (Yogic Transmission)

References

Further reading

External links

Autobiography of a Yogi on Wikisource:
Chapter 26: The Science of Kriya Yoga, describes the theory behind the Kriya Yoga technique
Chapter 31: An Interview with the Sacred Mother (Kashi Moni Lahiri), about Lahiri's disciple and wife Srimati Kashi Moni Devi
Chapter 34: Materializing a Palace in the Himalayas, recounts Lahiri's meeting with Mahavatar Babaji
Chapter 35: The Christlike Life of Lahiri Mahasaya, includes many stories and teachings of Lahiri Mahasaya

 

  

1828 births
1895 deaths
20th-century Bengalis
19th-century Bengalis
Bengali Hindus
Bengali Hindu saints
Indian Hindu religious leaders
19th-century Hindu religious leaders
Ascetics
Indian Hindu yogis
Hindu mystics
19th-century Indian monks
Indian Hindu monks
Indian yoga gurus
Kriya yogis
Paramahansa Yogananda
People from Krishnagar
Religious pluralism
Scholars from Varanasi
Spiritual practice